The 1977–78 Whitbread Round the World Race was the second edition of the around-the-world sailing event Whitbread Round the World Race. On 27 August 1977, 15 boats started out from Portsmouth for the Whitbread Round the World Race under a moderate Northerly breeze and light patchy rain. Most of the second Whitbread Race was dominated by a tight race between Swan 65 King's Legend and Flyer, the latter eventually winning the race. All 15 boats finished the  race. Great Britain II was winner on elapsed time for the second race in succession. This race was notable for the fact that Clare Francis became the first woman to skipper a Whitbread entry, the Swan 65 ADC Accutrac.

Legs

Results

References

External links
[* History]

The Ocean Race
Whitbread Round The World Race, 1977-78
Whitbread Round The World Race, 1977-78
1978 in New Zealand sport